The Vassako Bolo Strict Nature Reserve (Réserve Intégrale de la Vassako-Bolo) is an  nature reserve within Bamingui-Bangoran National Park and Biosphere Reserve in the northern region of the Central African Republic. It is located near the town of N'Délé, Bamingui-Bangoran prefecture. It was gazetted in 1960.

References

Protected areas of the Central African Republic
Protected areas established in 1960
Bamingui-Bangoran